Pervyi, Pervii or Pervy (first, masculine) or Pervaya (feminine) is a generic adjective added to various Russian names. It is also a surname. It may refer to

Pervaya Liga (Soviet Union), the second level of ice hockey in the Soviet Union
Perviy Kanal, the first television channel in the Russian Federation
Perviy Kanal Evraziya, Kazakhstani television station
Perviy Potseluy, debut album of Makpal Isabekova
Oleksandr Perviy (1960–1985), Ukrainian Olympic weightlifter